The Nicobarese languages or Nicobaric languages, form an isolated group of about half a dozen closely related Austroasiatic languages, spoken by most of the inhabitants of the Nicobar Islands of India. They have a total of about 30,000 speakers (22,100 native). Most Nicobarese speakers speak the Car language. Paul Sidwell (2015:179) considers the Nicobarese languages to subgroup with Aslian.

The Nicobarese languages appear to be related to the Shompen language of the indigenous inhabitants of the interior of Great Nicobar Island (Blench & Sidwell 2011), which is usually considered a separate branch of Austroasiatic. However, Paul Sidwell (2017) classifies Shompen as a Southern Nicobaric language rather than as a separate branch of Austroasiatic.

The morphological similarities between Nicobarese and Austronesian languages have been used as evidence for the Austric hypothesis (Reid 1994).

Languages
From north to south, the Nicobaric languages are:
Car: Car (Pū)
Chaura–Teressa: Chaura (Tutet/Sanënyö), Teressa (Taih-Long/Lurö)
Central: Nancowry (Nang-kauri/Mūöt), Camorta, Katchal (Tehnu)
Southern: Southern Nicobarese (Sambelong), Shompen (Shom Peng)

Classification
Paul Sidwell (2017) classifies the Nicobaric languages as follows.
Car
Chaura–Teressa
Teressa, Chaura
Central-Southern
Central: Nancowry, Camorta, Katchall 
Southern: Southern Nicobarese, Shompen

See also
Shompen language
List of Proto-Nicobarese reconstructions (Wiktionary)

References

Further reading
Adams, K. L. (1989). Systems of numeral classification in the Mon–Khmer, Nicobarese and Aslian subfamilies of Austroasiatic. Canberra, A.C.T., Australia: Dept. of Linguistics, Research School of Pacific Studies, Australian National University. 
Radhakrishnan, R. (1981). The Nancowry Word: Phonology, Affixal Morphology and Roots of a Nicobarese Language. Current Inquiry Into Language and Linguistics 37. Linguistic Research Inc., P.O. Box 5677, Station 'L', Edmonton, Alberta, Canada, T6C 4G1. 
Sidwell, Paul. 2018. Proto-Nicobarese phonology. In Papers from the Seventh International Conference on Austroasiatic Linguistics, 101-131. Journal of the Southeast Asian Linguistics Society Special Publication No. 3. University of Hawai’i Press.

External links
Nicobarese Languages Project (Paul Sidwell)

 
Languages of India